Manitoba Provincial Road 353 is a provincial road in southwestern region of the Canadian province of Manitoba.

Route description 

The route begins at PTH 5 near Oberon, and terminates at PTH 10.

PR 353 is an east–west highway providing access to the unincorporated communities of Brookdale and Moore Park. The road is generally quite straight and is paved for its entire length.

History 
In the early 1990s, the Manitoba government decommissioned a number of provincial secondary roads and returned the maintenance of these roads back to the rural municipalities. A large portion of the original PR 353 was included in this decommissioning.

Prior to this, PR 353 was more than twice its current length. It continued past its current eastbound terminus with PTH 5 (PR 258 prior to 1980) as a concurrence to the unincorporated community of Wellwood, where PR 353 continued east to meet PR 352. The two roads joined in a northwest concurrence to the unincorporated community of Edrans.

From Edrans, PR 353 continued east through the unincorporated community of Pine Creek Station to its terminus with PTH 34.

After decommissioning, maintenance of the former PR 353 was turned over to the Rural Municipalities of North Cypress and North Norfolk.

References

 

353